Palakoderu is a village in West Godavari district of the Indian state of Andhra Pradesh.

Demographics 

 Census of India, Palakoderu had a population of 6701. The total population constitute, 3312 males and 3389 females with a sex ratio of 1023 females per 1000 males. 601 children are in the age group of 0–6 years, with sex ratio of 908. The average literacy rate stands at 72.84%.

References 

Villages in West Godavari district